Crambus whitmerellus, or Whitmer's grass-veneer, is a moth in the family Crambidae. It was described by Alexander Barrett Klots in 1942. It has been recorded in North America from Alberta, Montana, Wyoming, Colorado and Utah. The habitat consists of grasslands.

The larvae probably feed on grasses.

Subspecies
Crambus whitmerellus whitmerellus
Crambus whitmerellus browni Klots, 1942 (Alberta, northern Montana)

References

Crambini
Moths described in 1942
Moths of North America